The neighborhood of Ludlow is a small neighborhood in Philadelphia, Pennsylvania.   It is bordered by Girard Avenue to the south and Cecil B. Moore Avenue to the north.  It extends from 5th Street west to 9th Street. Ludlow is about 65.9% African American, 18.9% Hispanic, 10% White, 4.8% Asian, and 1.4% all other.

Neighborhoods in Philadelphia
Lower North Philadelphia